The Semovente da 75/46 was an Italian tank destroyer used during World War II.

Development
After the armistice of Cassibile signed in September 1943, Northern and Central Italy fell under German control. In 1944 the progress of the war led them to order a new Italian armoured vehicle for a tank-fighting role, based on the Semovente da 105/25 self-propelled gun. The result was the Semovente da 75/46, which was named Sturmgeschütz M 43 mit 75/46 (852) (i) by the Germans, following their naming convention.

The 75/46 shared the same "M 43" hull of the Semovente da 105/25.
The other main difference with its precursor was in the overall increased armour: sloped plates were applied to the casemate and others were added on the sides, above the tracks. Due to these features and despite its origins, the 75/46 is considered a tank destroyer in every respect.

Production
Between 1944 and the end of World War II in Italy, Ansaldo managed to assemble only 11 or 13 vehicles, all deployed exclusively by the Wehrmacht. Their standard camouflage, applied just after assembly, was Saharian Khaki background with reddish-brown and gray-green patches.

References

Armoured fighting vehicles of Italy
World War II armoured fighting vehicles of Italy
World War II self-propelled artillery
World War II tank destroyers
75 mm artillery
Gio. Ansaldo & C. armored vehicles
Military vehicles introduced from 1940 to 1944